Kaqusha Jashari ( Fejzullahu; born 16 August 1946) is a Kosovo Albanian politician and engineer by profession. She is a member of the Assembly of Kosovo on the Democratic Party of Kosovo list since 2007.

From 1986 until November 1988, she and Azem Vllasi were the two leading Kosovo politicians. In November 1988, they were both dismissed in the "anti-bureaucratic revolution" because of their unwillingness to accept the constitutional amendments curbing Kosovo's autonomy, and were replaced by proxies of Slobodan Milošević, the leader of the League of Communists of Serbia at the time.

Early life
Kaqusha Jashari was born in Skenderaj, the daughter of Halil Fejzullahu. The family had an apartment in Bulevar kralja Aleksandra, Belgrade, which Jashari lived in after her father's death, although Radmila Vuličević from Pristina claims to be the legal owner. She is the sister of former handball manager and player Petrit Fejzula.

Politics
In May 1988 Jashari replaced Azem Vllasi as the President of the Provincial Committee of the League of Communists of Kosovo. It seems that Serbia "accepted" her as it was said at the time it that her mother was Montenegrin.

From 17 to 21 October there were Albanian protests throughout Kosovo against the changing of status of the SAP Kosovo. On 17 November 1988, Jashari and Vllasi were forced to resign and Rahman Morina was elected President of the Provincial Committee on 27 January 1989 by the Presidium of the Provincial Committee. This sparked new protests by Albanian youths and workers. They were both dismissed because of their unwillingness to accept the constitutional amendments curbing Kosovo's autonomy, and were replaced by proxies of Slobodan Milošević, the leader of the League of Communists of Serbia at the time.

On 20 October 1990 Marko Orlandić and Jashari guested the gathering of Serbs and Montenegrins in Kosovo Polje, which was not met with positive reactions.

She was the president of the Social Democratic Party of Kosovo (PSDK) from 1991 until 2008, when she was succeeded by the former prime minister and Kosovo Liberation Army (KLA) guerilla leader Agim Çeku.

Annotations

References

External links
Kosovo Assembly MP Page

1946 births
Living people
Democratic Party of Kosovo politicians
Kosovan women in politics
Yugoslav women in politics
20th-century women politicians
Prime ministers of Kosovo
Kosovan engineers
League of Communists of Kosovo politicians
People from Skenderaj
Yugoslav Albanians
Politicians from Mitrovica, Kosovo